In mathematics – specifically, in differential equations – the Picard–Lindelöf theorem gives a set of conditions under which an initial value problem has a unique solution. It is also known as Picard's existence theorem, the Cauchy–Lipschitz theorem, or the existence and uniqueness theorem.

The theorem is named after Émile Picard, Ernst Lindelöf, Rudolf Lipschitz and Augustin-Louis Cauchy.

Theorem 
Then, there exists some   such that the initial value problem

has a unique solution  on the interval .

Note that  is often instead required to be open but even under such an assumption, the proof only uses a closed rectangle within .

Proof sketch 
The proof relies on transforming the differential equation, and applying  Banach fixed-point theorem. By integrating both sides, any function satisfying the differential equation must also satisfy the integral equation

A simple proof of existence of the solution is obtained by successive approximations. In this context, the method is known as Picard iteration.

Set

and

It can then be shown, by using the Banach fixed-point theorem, that the sequence of "Picard iterates"  is convergent and that the limit is a solution to the problem.

See Newton's method of successive approximation for instruction.

Example of Picard iteration 
Let  the solution to the equation  with initial condition  Starting with  we iterate 

 

so that :

and so on.

Example of non-uniqueness 
To understand uniqueness of solutions, consider the following examples. A differential equation can possess a stationary point. Beginning with another initial condition , the solution y(t) tends toward the stationary point, but reaches it only at the limit of infinite time, so the uniqueness of solutions (over all finite times) is guaranteed. 

However, for an equation in which the stationary solution is reached after a finite time, the uniqueness fails. This happens for example for the equation , which has at least two solutions corresponding to the initial condition  such as:  or 

so the previous state of the system is not uniquely determined by its state after t = 0.

Detailed proof 
Let

where:

This is the compact cylinder where    is defined. Let

this is, the supremum of (the absolute values of) the slopes of the function.

We will proceed to apply the Banach fixed-point theorem using the metric on  induced by the uniform norm

We define an operator between two function spaces of continuous functions, Picard's operator, as follows:

defined by:

We must show that this operator maps a complete non-empty metric space X into itself and also is a contraction mapping.

Here,  is a closed ball in the space of continuous (and bounded) functions "centered" at the constant function . Hence we need to show that 

implies

where  is some number in  where the maximum is achieved. The last inequality in the chain is true if we impose the requirement .

Now let's prove that this operator is a contraction mapping.

Given two functions , in order to apply the Banach fixed-point theorem we require

So let  be such that

This is a contraction if 

We have established that the Picard's operator is a contraction on the Banach spaces with the metric induced by the uniform norm. This allows us to apply  the Banach fixed-point theorem to conclude that the operator has a unique fixed point. In particular, there is a unique function

such that . This function is the unique solution of the initial value problem, valid on the interval Ia where a satisfies the condition

Optimization of the solution's interval
Nevertheless, there is a corollary of the Banach fixed-point theorem: if an operator T n is a contraction for some n in N, then T has a unique fixed point. Before applying this theorem to the Picard operator, recall the following:

Proof. Induction on m.

By taking a supremum over  we see that .

This inequality assures that for some large m, 

and hence Γm will be a contraction. So by the previous corollary Γ will have a unique fixed point. Finally, we have been able to optimize the interval of the solution by taking .

In the end, this result shows the interval of definition of the solution does not depend on the Lipschitz constant of the field, but only on the interval of definition of the field and its maximum absolute value.

Other existence theorems 
The Picard–Lindelöf theorem shows that the solution exists and that it is unique. For example, the right-hand side of the equation  with initial condition  is continuous but not Lipschitz continuous. Indeed, rather than being unique, this equation has three solutions:

.

Although these conditions are only sufficient, there also exist necessary and sufficient conditions for the solution of an initial value problem to be unique, such as Okamura's theorem.

See also 

 Frobenius theorem (differential topology)
 Integrability conditions for differential systems
 Newton's method
 Euler method
 Trapezoidal rule

Notes

References 

 
  (In that article Lindelöf discusses a generalization of an earlier approach by Picard.)

External links 

 Fixed Points and the Picard Algorithm, recovered from http://www.krellinst.org/UCES/archive/classes/CNA/dir2.6/uces2.6.html.
 

Augustin-Louis Cauchy
Lipschitz maps
Ordinary differential equations
Theorems in analysis
Uniqueness theorems